Dashteh may refer to:
 Dashteh, Hamadan
 Dashteh, West Azerbaijan

See also
 Bala Dashteh, Ilam Province